The National Forum of Civil and Civic Awakening (FONEC) was a political party in Benin.

History
FONEC was established in late 1995. In the 1996 presidential elections it supported the victorious candidate Mathieu Kérékou.

The party subsequently joined the Suru Alliance to contest the 1999 parliamentary elections, alongside the Union for Democracy and National Reconstruction (UDRN), the Forum for Democracy, Development and Morality (FDDM) and the Union for Homeland and Progress (UPP). The alliance received 1.5% of the vote, winning a single seat taken by the UPP's Gado Girigissou.

It was part of the Union for Future Benin for the 2003 elections.

References

Defunct political parties in Benin
Political parties established in 1995